Sayala is a village located in Palam Taluka of Parbhani district, in state of Maharashtra.

Demographics
As per 2011 census:
Sayala has 286 families residing. The village has population of 1456.
Out of the population of 1456, 749 are males while 707 are females. 
Literacy rate of the village is 80.22%.
Average sex ratio of Sayala village is 944 females to 1000 males. Average sex ratio of Maharashtra state is 929.

Geography, and transport

References

Villages in Parbhani district